Robert Rock is an English golfer.

The name may also refer to:
Bob Rock, Canadian musician, sound engineer, and record producer
Bobby Rock, former percussionist for Lita Ford and  American rock band Nitro
Rob Rock, American heavy metal musician
Robert L. Rock, American politician
Robert F. Rock, American police chief